Tyndale New Testament Commentaries (or TNTC) is a series of commentaries in English on the New Testament. It is published by the Inter-Varsity Press.

Constantly being revised since its first being completed, the series seek to bridge the gap between brevity and scholarly comment.

Reviews

Titles
replaced -  - 285 pages
 - 480 pages
replaced -  - 347 pages
Schnabel, Eckhard J. Mark. 2. Downers Grove, IL: IVP Academic, 2017. - 448 pages
 - 370 pages
replaced -  - 237 pages
 - 389 pages
replaced -  - 197 pages
 - 448 pages
 - 283 pages
replaced - * - 256 pages
 
replaced -  - 192 pages
 - 240 pages
 - 242 pages
replaced -  - 192 pages
 - 240 pages (forthcoming)
 - 192 pages
replaced -  - 112 pages
 - 192 pages
 - 160 pages
 - 240 pages
replaced -  - 217 pages
replaced -  - 281 pages
 - 352 pages
 - 208 pages
replaced -  - 192 pages
 - 256 pages
 - 224 pages
 - 240 pages
 - 256 pages

See also 
 Tyndale Old Testament Commentaries
 Exegesis

References

External links 
 IVP's publisher Tyndale New Testament Commentary — official page of series at publisher's site.

Biblical commentaries